Entorno do Distrito Federal Microregion (also: Entorno de Brasília) is a statistical microregion in Goiás state, Brazil, consisting of municipalities located in the vicinity of the Federal District of Brazil.

Municipalities 
The microregion consists of the following municipalities:

References

IBGE
Sepin

Microregions of Goiás